This is a list of Norwegian television related events from 1998.

Events
Unknown - Toril Moe, performing as Celine Dion wins the third series of Stjerner i sikte. She was the first woman to have won.

Debuts

Television shows

1990s
Sesam Stasjon (1991-1999)
Stjerner i sikte (1996-2002)

Ending this year

Births

Deaths

See also
1998 in Norway